Harcourt Gladstone Malcolm CBE, KC (7 February 1875 – 26 December 1936) was a Bahamian lawyer and politician.

Malcolm was born in 1875, the son of Ormond Drimmie Malcolm and his wife, the former Ann Frances Sands.

Malcolm's father Ormond had been the Speaker of the House of Assembly from 1868 to 1897 and the younger Malcolm was elected Speaker of the House of Assembly in February 1914 following the death of the previous speaker WCB Johnson.  He served as Speaker from 1914 until his death in 1936 from influenza and cerebral hemorrhage.

References

1875 births
1936 deaths
Speakers of the House of Assembly of the Bahamas